Arthur Mahler (born 1 August 1871, Prague - died 2 May 1916, Vienna) was a Czech-Austrian archeologist. He was a cousin of composer Gustav Mahler.

Biography
After completing his studies at the gymnasium in Prague, he studied the history of art and archeology at the universities of Prague and Vienna (Ph.D.), and in 1902 became privatdozent in archeology at the German university at Prague.

He was a member of the Austrian House of Representatives from 1907 to 1911 for the Jewish National Party.

Arthur Mahler was married to Sophie Mahlerová. Their son, Willy Mahler, died in 1945 in Dachau concentration camp.

Literary works 
He has contributed a number of articles to:
 "Jahreshefte des Österreichischen Archäologischen Institutes" (of which institute he is a corresponding member)
 "Revue Archäologique"
 "Journal d'Archäologie Numismatique"

He is the author of Polyklet und Seine Schule: ein Beitrag zur Gesch. der Griechischen Plastik (Leipzig, 1902).

He also delivered a series of lectures at the American School for Archeology at Rome.

External links
 

1871 births
1916 deaths
Scientists from Prague
People from the Kingdom of Bohemia
Czech Jews
Jewish National Party politicians
Members of the Austrian House of Deputies (1907–1911)
Czech archaeologists
Austrian archaeologists
Arthur
Charles University alumni
Academic staff of Charles University